Neshukay is a rural locality (an aul) in Ponezhukayskoye Rural Settlement of Teuchezhsky District, the Republic of Adygea, Russia. The population was 911 as of 2018. There are 14 streets.

Geography 
The aul is on the left bank of the Marta River, 4 km northeast of Ponezhukay (the district's administrative centre) by road. Ponezhukay is the nearest rural locality.

Ethnicity 
The aul is inhabited by Russians and Adyghes.

References 

Rural localities in Teuchezhsky District